Panegyra is a genus of moths belonging to the subfamily Tortricinae of the family Tortricidae. The genus was erected by Alexey Diakonoff in 1960.

Species
Panegyra cerussochlaena Razowski, 2005
Panegyra cosmophora Diakonoff, 1960
Panegyra flavicostana (Walsingham, 1891)
Panegyra metria Razowski, 2005
Panegyra micans Razowski, 2005
Panegyra praetexta Razowski & Wojtusiak, 2012
Panegyra sectatrix (Razowski, 1981)
Panegyra sokokana Razowski, 2012
Panegyra stenovalva Razowski, 2005

See also
List of Tortricidae genera

References

 Brown, J. W. (2005). World Catalogue of Insects. 5 Tortricidae.
 Diakonoff, A. (1960). Verhandelingen der Koninklijke Nederlandse Akademie van Wetenschappen. (2) 53 (2): 204.
 Razowski, J. (1981). "Nigerian Tortricini (Lepidoptera, Tortricidae). Razowski". Acta Zoologica Cracoviensia. 25 (14): 319–340.
 Razowski, J. (2012). "Tortricidae (Lepidoptera) from the Tervuren Museum: 1. Tortricini and Chlidanotini". Polish Journal of Entomology. 81 (2): 129–143. 
 Razowski, J. & Wojtusiak, J. (2012). "Tortricidae (Lepidoptera) from Nigeria". , Acta Zoologica Cracoviensia. 55 (2): 59-130.

External links
Tortricid.net

Tortricini
Tortricidae genera
Taxa named by Alexey Diakonoff